Profundiconus zardoyai is a species of sea snail, a marine gastropod mollusc in the family Conidae, the cone snails and their allies.

Like all species within the genus Profundiconus, these cone snails are predatory and venomous. They are capable of "stinging" humans, therefore live ones should be handled carefully or not at all.

Description
The size of the shell attains 10 mm.

Distribution
This marine species occurs off New Caledonia.

References

 Tenorio M. (2015). A new Profundiconus from northern New Caledonia: Profundiconus zardoyai sp. nov. (Gastropoda, Conilithidae). Xenophora Taxonomy. 6: 38–46

External links
 

zardoyai
Gastropods described in 2015